"Virtual Diva" is the first single by Puerto Rican reggaeton performer Don Omar from his third studio album iDon. It was released on February 3, 2009, through Machete Music and VI Music. The song was released through nationwide airplay in December 2008, and has since become the most requested song at urban radio, reaching the number-one position on the Billboard Latin Rhythm Airplay chart. The song is included in the soundtrack of Grand Theft Auto IV, the soundtrack of Saints Row: The Third as well as in the Fast & Furious soundtrack.

Music video
 
A music video for "Virtual Diva" was produced and filmed in Buenos Aires, Argentina. Around the end of January 2009, after celebrating with fellow working bachata group Marcy Place while performing at the Providence Club in New York City, Don Omar was finishing up on recording his new studio album. It would eventually be announced that he would be traveling down to Argentina once again to start filming the music video, which finished production on February 13, 2009. The video feature Argentinean model Ingrid Grudke, who portrays a doctor who wants to perform a grand experiment transforming Don Omar into half-man, half-machine.

The song was also performed live for the first time on the MTV Tr3́s variety series, Entertainment as a Second Language, on February 26, 2009.

Track listings and formats
Digital download single
 "Virtual Diva" – 3:59

Charts

Certifications

References

External links
 iDon.com

2009 singles
Don Omar songs
Songs written for films
Record Report Top Latino number-one singles
2009 songs
Machete Music singles
Songs written by Don Omar